Comedy Central Hungary is the Hungarian version of Comedy Central. The channel broadcasts comedy oriented shows.

Programming 
Shows in this channel include:

Current

Former running programs

 Gary Unmarried (2012-2014, as Elvált Gary)
Threesome (2014, as Édeshármas)
Yes, Dear (Igen, drágám!)
Arrested Development (TV series) (Az ítélet család)
The IT Crowd (Kockafejek)
Scrubs (Dokik)
Dharma & Greg (Dharma és Greg)
Irigy Hónaljmirigy (a Hungarian sitcom)
It's Always Sunny in Philadelphia (Felhőtlen Philadelphia)
Késő este Hajós Andrással (Late Night with Hajós András - a Hungarian comedy talk show)
Reba
The League of Gentlemen (Kretének Klubja)
Little Britain (Angolkák)
Drawn Together (Firka Villa)
Ugly Americans (Furcsa Amcsik)
Kröd Mändoon and the Flaming Sword of Fire
'Allo 'Allo! (Halló, halló!)
A Bit of Fry & Laurie (Egy kis Fry és Laurie)
Mr. Bean (Mr. Bean)
The Sarah Silverman Program
The Penguins of Madagascar (A Madagaszkár pingvinjei)
The Office (U.S. TV series) (A hivatal)
Neighbours from Hell (Pokoli szomszédok)
SpongeBob SquarePants (SpongyaBob Kockanadrág)
Workaholics (A munka hősei´)
My Hero (Én hősöm)
Banánhéj (Hungarian sitcom)
Beugró (Hungarian sitcom)
Van képünk hozzá (Hungarian sitcom)
You Rang, M'Lord? (Csengetett mylord?)
Vastyúk is talál szeget (Hungarian sitcom)
Louie (TV series) (Louie)
Joey

Logos

External links 
 Comedy Central Hungary

Comedy Central
Television networks in Hungary
Hungarian-language television stations
Television channels and stations established in 2008